The Fort Portal–Kasese–Mpondwe Road also Fort Portal–Mpondwe Road,  is a road in the Western Region of Uganda, connecting the towns of Fort Portal, Hima, Kasese, Kikorongo and the border town of Mpondwe.

Location
The road starts at Fort Portal, the headquarters of Kabarole District. It travels southwestwards through Rwimi, Hima, Kasese and Kikorongo. The coordinates of the road at Kikorongo are:0°00'00.0"N, 29°59'55.0"E (Latitude:0.000003; 29.998607).

Upgrade to bituminous surface
This road was improved to class II bituminous surface before 2013.

Points of interest
The following lie along or near this road

1. Virika Hospital, located in Fort Portal's central business district.

2.

3.

4.

5. Kasese Cobalt Company Limited lies in Kasese, south of the central business district.

6. At Kikorongo, the road takes a 90 degrees turn to the right and heads westwards towards the border with the Democratic Republic of the Congo.

7. At Katojo Village a road branches off this road and proceeds south to Katwe Village and Mweya Safari Lodge, inside Queen Elizabeth National Park.

See also
 Uganda National Roads Authority
 List of roads in Uganda

References

External links
 Webpage of Uganda National Road Authority
 Photograph of Fort Portal–Kasese–Mpondwe Road At Flickr.com

Roads in Uganda
Kabarole District
Kasese District